Conus alexandrinus is a species of sea snail, a marine gastropod mollusk in the family Conidae, the cone snails, cone shells or cones.

Description
The size of the shell varies between 18 mm and 34 mm.

Distribution
This species occurs in the Atlantic Ocean off Angola.

References

 Filmer R.M. (2001). A Catalogue of Nomenclature and Taxonomy in the Living Conidae 1758 - 1998. Backhuys Publishers, Leiden. 388pp.
 Rolán E. & Röckel D. 2000. The endemic Conus of Angola. Argonauta 13(2): 5-44, 150 figs.
 Rosenberg, G. & Petit, R. E. 2003. Kaicher's Card Catalogue of World-Wide Shells: A collation, with discussion of species named therein. Nautilus. 117 (4): 99-120.
 Puillandre N., Duda T.F., Meyer C., Olivera B.M. & Bouchet P. (2015). One, four or 100 genera? A new classification of the cone snails. Journal of Molluscan Studies. 81: 1-23

External links
 To World Register of Marine Species
 

Endemic fauna of Angola
alexandrinus
Gastropods described in 1977